The 1985 College Football All-America team is composed of college football players who were selected as All-Americans by various organizations and writers that chose College Football All-America Teams in 1985. The National Collegiate Athletic Association (NCAA) recognizes five selectors as "official" for the 1985 season. They are: (1) the American Football Coaches Association (AFCA); (2) the Associated Press (AP) selected based on the votes of sports writers at AP newspapers; (3) the Football Writers Association of America (FWAA); (4) the United Press International (UPI) selected based on the votes of sports writers at UPI newspapers; and (5) the Walter Camp Football Foundation (WC).  Other selectors included Football News (FN), Gannett News Service (GNS), the Newspaper Enterprise Association (NEA), Pro Football Weekly, Scripps Howard (SH), and The Sporting News (TSN).

Ten players were unanimously selected as first-team All-Americans by all five official selectors.  They are:
 Bo Jackson, Auburn running back who rushed for 1,786 yards and won the 1985 Heisman Trophy;
 Chuck Long, Iowa quarterback who won the 1985 Davey O'Brien Award and Maxwell Award and placed second in the 1985 Heisman Trophy voting; 
 Lorenzo White, Michigan State running back who became the first Big Ten Conference player to rush for over 2,000 yards and placed fourth in the 1985 Heisman Trophy voting;
 Brian Bosworth, Oklahoma linebacker who won the 1985 Dick Butkus Award;
 David Williams, Illinois wide receiver who caught 85 passes for 1,047 yards and finished his college career as the second leading receiver in NCAA history;
 Larry Station, Iowa linebacker who led the team in tackles for the fourth straight season with 129; 
 John Lee, UCLA placekicker who set the NCAA record for highest percentage of extra points and field goals made in a career with 93.3% (116 of 117 PATs, 79 of 92 FGs);
 Jim Dombrowski, Virginia offensive tackle;
 Leslie O'Neal, Oklahoma defensive end; and
 Tim Green, Syracuse defensive end.

Consensus All-Americans
The following charts identify the NCAA-recognized consensus All-Americans for the year 1985 and displays which first-team designations they received.

Offense

Defense

Special teams

Offense

Quarterbacks 

 Chuck Long, Iowa (CFHOF) (AFCA, AP, FWAA, UPI, WC, GNS, NEA-1, SH, TSN)
 Vinny Testaverde, Miami (Fla.) (CFHOF)  (AP-2, UPI-2)
 Jim Everett, Purdue (AP-3)

Running backs 

 Bo Jackson, Auburn (CFHOF) (AFCA, AP, FWAA, UPI, WC, GNS, NEA-1, SH, TSN)
 Lorenzo White, Michigan State (AFCA, AP, FWAA, UPI, WC, GNS, NEA-1, SH, TSN)
 Napoleon McCallum, Navy (CFHOF) (AP-2, WC)
 Reggie Dupard, SMU (AP-2, FWAA, UPI-2)
 Thurman Thomas, Oklahoma State (CFHOF) (AP-3, UPI)
 Doug DuBose, Nebraska (UPI-2)
 Paul Palmer, Temple (UPI-2)
 Tom Rathman, Nebraska (AP-3)

Wide receivers 

 David Williams, Illinois  (AFCA, AP-1, FWAA, UPI-1, WC, NEA-1, SH, TSN)
 Tim McGee, Tennessee (AFCA, AP-1, UPI-1, GNS, NEA-1, SH)
 Lew Barnes, Oregon (AP-2, FWAA)
 Kelvin Martin, Boston College (TSN)
 Webster Slaughter, San Diego State (AP-2)
 Mark Bellini, BYU (AP-3, UPI-2)
 Walter Murray, Hawaii (AP-3, GNS)
 Richard Estell, Kansas (UPI-2)

Tight ends 

 Willie Smith, Miami (Fla.) (AFCA, AP-1, WC, NEA-1, SH, TSN)
 Brian Forster, Rhode Island (GNS)
 Keith Jackson, Oklahoma (AP-2)
 Eric Kattus, Michigan (AP-3)

Centers 

 Peter Anderson, Georgia (AFCA, AP-1, UPI-1, GNS, TSN)
 Gene Chilton, Texas (AP-3, UPI-2, WC, NEA-1)
 Bill Lewis, Nebraska (AP-2, FWAA, SH)

Guards 

 Jeff Bregel, USC (AFCA, AP-1, FWAA, UPI-1, NEA-1, SH, TSN)
 John Rienstra, Temple (AP-1, FWAA, GNS, NEA-1, SH)
 J. D. Maarleveld, Maryland (AFCA, UPI-1, NEA-1 [OT])
 Jamie Dukes, Florida State (AP-2, FWAA, UPI-2, WC, SH)
 Jeff Zimmerman, Florida (AP-3, UPI-2, WC, GNS, TSN)
 Tim Scannell, Notre Dame (SH)
 Don Smith, Army (AP-2)
 Todd Moules, Penn State (AP-3)

Tackles 

 Jim Dombrowski, Virginia (CFHOF) (AFCA, AP-1, FWAA, UPI-1, WC, NEA-1, TSN)
 Brian Jozwiak, West Virginia (AP-1, UPI-1, WC)
 John Davis, Georgia Tech (TSN)
 Don Smith, Army (AFCA)
 James FitzPatrick, USC (GNS)
 Joe Milinichik, North Carolina State (GNS)
 John Clay, Missouri (AP-2)
 Doug Williams, Texas A&M (AP-2, UPI-2)
 Mark Cochran, Baylor (UPI-2)
 Steve Wallace, Auburn (AP-3)
 Will Wolford, Vanderbilt (AP-3)

Defense

Defensive ends 

 Leslie O'Neal, Oklahoma State (AFCA, AP, FWAA, UPI, WC, GNS, NEA-1 [DT], SH, TSN)
 Tim Green, Syracuse (AFCA, AP, FWAA, UPI, WC, GNS, SH, TSN)
 Pat Swilling, Georgia Tech (CFHOF) (FWAA, UPI-2)
 Jim Skow, Nebraska (AFCA, UPI-2)

Defensive tackles 

 Tony Casillas, Oklahoma (CFHOF)  (AP, FWAA, UPI, WC, GNS, NEA-1 [NG], SH, TSN)
 Mike Hammerstein, Michigan (AFCA, AP, UPI, GNS, NEA-1, SH)
 Jon Hand, Alabama (TSN)

Middle guards 

 Mike Ruth, Boston College (CFHOF) (AFCA, FWAA, UPI, WC, GNS, SH)

Linebackers 

 Brian Bosworth, Oklahoma (CFHOF) (AFCA, AP, FWAA, UPI, WC, GNS)
 Larry Station, Iowa (CFHOF) (AFCA, AP, FWAA, UPI, WC, NEA-1, SH)
 Johnny Holland, Texas A&M (AP, FWAA, UPI-2)
 Cornelius Bennett, Alabama (CFHOF) (UPI-2, WC, TSN)
 Pepper Johnson, Ohio State (UPI)
 Michael Brooks, LSU (AP, GNS, SH)
 Kevin Murphy, Oklahoma (UPI-2 [line], NEA-1, TSN)
 Alonzo Johnson, Florida (UPI-2 [line], GNS, SH, TSN)
 Shane Conlan, Penn State (CFHOF) (UPI-2, NEA-1)
 Chris Spielman, Ohio State (CFHOF) (NEA-1)
 Mike Mallory, Michigan (UPI-2)

Defensive backs 

 David Fulcher, Arizona State (AFCA, AP-1, UPI-1, WC, GNS, NEA-1, TSN)
 Brad Cochran, Michigan (AFCA, FWAA, UPI-1, WC, SH)
 Scott Thomas, Air Force (AFCA, FWAA, UPI-2, WC, NEA-1)
 Allen Durden, Arizona (UPI-1, WC, NEA-1)
 Thomas Everett, Baylor (AFCA, AP-1)
 Mark Moore, Oklahoma State (AP-1, UPI-2, GNS, TSN)
 Tim McDonald, USC  (TSN)
 Mark Collins, Cal-State Fullerton (GNS, TSN)
 Michael Zordich, Penn State (FWAA, SH)
 Rod Woodson, Purdue (CFHOF) (NEA-1)
 Chris White, Tennessee (SH)
 Phil Parker, Michigan State (UPI-2)
 Odell Jones, East Carolina ( UPI-2) FWAA

Special teams

Placekickers 

 John Lee, UCLA (AFCA, AP-1, FWAA, UPI-1, WC, GNS, NEA-1, SH, TSN)
 John Diettrich, Ball State (AP-2)
 Carlos Reveiz, Tennessee (AP-3, UPI-2)

Punters 

 Barry Helton, Colorado (AP-1, UPI-1, WC, GNS)
 Lewis Colbert, Auburn (AFCA, UPI-2, TSN)
 Bill Smith, Mississippi  (FWAA)
 Ray Criswell, Florida (NEA-1)
 Mark Simon, Air Force (AP-2, SH)
 Steve Kidd, Rice (AP-3)

Returners 

 Errol Tucker, Utah (FWAA, GNS, TSN)

Key 
 Bold – Consensus All-American
 -1 – First-team selection
 -2 – Second-team selection
 -3 – Third-team selection
 CFHOF = College Football Hall of Fame inductee

Official selectors

 AFCA – American Football Coaches Association (AFCA), selected by the members of the AFCA for the Kodak All-America team
 AP – Associated Press
 FWAA – Football Writers Association of America
 UPI – United Press International
 WC – Walter Camp Football Foundation

Other selectors

 FN – Football News
 GNS – Gannett News Service selected by Joel S. Buchsbaum
 NEA – Newspaper Enterprise Association
 PFW – Pro Football Weekly
 SH – Scripps Howard
 TSN – The Sporting News

See also
 1985 All-Big Eight Conference football team
 1985 All-Big Ten Conference football team
 1985 All-Pacific-10 Conference football team
 1985 All-SEC football team

References 

All-America Team
College Football All-America Teams